Vanessa Yeung (born on 23 January 1972 in Shanghai) is a model from Hong Kong, a columnist, radio and television show host. She is somewhat proficient in several languages, including French, Korean, Cantonese, English and Mandarin. She often uses multiple languages to preside over ceremonies.

Early life 
In January 1972, Yeung was born in Shanghai, China.

Education 
Yeung graduated from the Department of Business Administration of Hong Kong Lingnan University.

Career 
A friend introduced Yeung filming of the advertising when she was in high school. Yeung's career started in 1995 when she won the "1st Elite Model Look" title. Later, she was invited by the top designer Vivieene Tam to New York Fashion Show, signed by the second big management company “Ford”, and moved to New York. She attended Paris, London and Milan Fashion Week regularly, and has performed in Hermes, Chanel, Sophia Kokosaiaki etc. Subsequently, she has returned to Hong Kong, has been participating in fashion shows organized by the HKTDC Hong Kong Fashion Week and many brands of fashion show and  work as a master of ceremonies, to expand her career opportunities in the modelling industry.

In addition to the modeling job, Vanessa also participated hosted and film performances, she has starred in several movies and TV programs. In 2003, she participated for the Asian TV News program "Family Wisdom", this is the first performance in television show.
In addition, she participated in the television show "Beautiful Cooking" in 2006 and won the second awards in the "heaven and hell battle". She hosted difference kinds of life, food and information programs in TVB such as “Better Living” in 2006 & 2008, “Market Trotter" in 2007 and the "Land of Fengshui" in 2010 and so on. In October 2013, she presided over the "Star Biz Endeavours" for now TV and interviewed the celebrity of their business experience.

Columnist
Yeung likes writing and food, often published English prose and travel articles in major newspapers and magazines. Early in 1996, she began writing at "Wen Wei Po".

Yeung's articles have appeared in Elle, Marie Claire, Cosmopolitan and other international female magazine. Her articles also appeared in the trend magazine "ZIP", lifestyle magazine "Lisa taste," Economic Daily "etnet" , issued more than 500,000 copies of "Skypost" and travel magazine "U Magazine". In addition, she also launched two books.At 2002, Vanessa launched her first autobiographical "2555 days" about her experience as a model for seven years. In May 2012, Vanessa spent three years traveled more than a dozen cities such as Paris, London, New York and San Francisco, Los Angeles, Lyon, Amsterdam, tasted a hundred of Michelin cuisine, interviewed with dozens Michelin chef for published the first Michelin restaurant cookbook 《For Two in 32 minutes　把米芝蓮廚藝帶回家》. This cookbook won the second award in "Gourmand Awards 2013" which included the interview of 26 Michelin chefs, demonstrates and the 53-star recipes.

In 2014, she made a new attempt on the sports column writing about World Cup in the newspaper “the-sun”.

In 2015, she had a new column on sky post called "Friday Vanessa".

In 2018, she had a new column on Apple daily called "Vanessa Discovery".

Radio show host
Vanessa hosted "Eve Marie” on RTHK Radio 2 broadcast and invited celebrity guests to share the views on love. Since August 27, 2012, she hosted the program "A circle" in the commercial radio. Apart from interviewing the artists, she also hosted the other sections of "Korea Circle", "Pink's Decade" and "Tasting Generation".

Korea
Vanessa has closely connected with South Korea. In April 2008, Vanessa cooperation with “Sunflower Travel” and “Korea Tourism Organization” to organize the tour to Busan and Seoul which use "Dress up fashion, spa and cuisine" as the theme, to share fashion trends, catwalk and cooking tips. In April 2012, she was invited to the Korea Tourism Food Festival by Korean Food Tourism Association, being an international honorary ambassador to promote Korean food culture. In October, she was invited to 2012 Busan International Film Festival to watch movies in VIP zone and learn to cook Korean cuisine in Korean culture museum. Later, she was invited to the South Korean TV station KBS to see popular songs show "MUSIC BANK", close distance to see Beast, Kara, BAP and other K pop stars. In October 2013, she attended the talent show “SIA Awards 2013”, and South Korea's top entertainment company YG Entertainment sponsored "WIN Who's next" final, close distance to see SNSD, G-Dragon, Crayon Pop, etc. ... Vanessa loves Korean culture. Besides studying Korean, she also had a Korea section in the program "A circle" which interviewed number of popular Korean stars, including the popular Korea super Junior M member Zhou Mi(조미), South Korea New girl group A Pink, Shinhwa(신화)member Jun Jin, the popular boy band Infinite, popular girl group Crayon Pop and the actress from "Take Care Of Us, Captain," "Boys Over Flowers," Gu Hye Soon (구혜선) and so on ...

Philanthropy
Vanessa has always been participating in charity work; she had been supporting Oxfam, Hong Chi Association and Fu Hong Society. She is the first model being the ambassador of Oxfam Hong Kong, even went to India and Africa to visit and experience living in poverty. In addition, she is fully support to poverty reduction activities, such as fair trade activities, support for farmers in developing countries, Chung Ying Theatre Company's "Kids at Room 2009" fundraising events, sharing Mainland flood relief situation and joined the event of International Day for the Eradication of Poverty.

In addition, Vanessa is a senior diver with  an "Open Water Diver license" and "Advanced Divers License". She has hosted for Radio Television Hong Kong for two series of "Diving Program" to lead the audience to observe the sea, presented the unspoiled marine ecosystems in front of audience, so that raise the awareness of protecting about the marine ecosystem in the public.

Filmography

Hong Kong Cable Television Limited (I-Cable)
2014: 《Culture Plus》
2015: 《Tasty Bureau》

Television Broadcasts Limited (TVB)
2006: 《Better Living》(Season II)
2007: 《The Vineyard》
2007: 《Market Trotter》
2008: 《Better Living》(Season IV)
2009: 《Home Brewed》
2009: 《Travel Specialist In Guangdong》
2010: 《Shanghai Delicacy Exposed》
2010: 《Land of Fengshui》
2013: 《Riva In Italy》
2015: 《In Vino Veritas 2》
2016: 《Nice Wheels》
2016: 《Midnight Muchies》

Asia Television Limited (ATV)
《Family Wisdom》

Radio Television Hong Kong (RTHK)
2001: 《Have fun with English》
2001: 《Beauty design your destiny》
2001: 《Yuen Long》
2007: 《Diving Program》Season I
2009: 《Diving Program》Season II
2011: 《ICAC Investigators 2011》
2013: 《HK Industries》

Commercial Radio Hong Kong
《A Circle》

now TV
2013: 《Star Biz Endeavours》

Film
1997: Yesterday You, Yesterday Me
1998: Hot War
2010: Fire of Conscience

Commercials
Pantene
Fancl MCO
Organic Day
Mitsumura
Hythiol C Premiere
MediaHK
Tulip Pork Luncheon Meat
Standard Chartered SME Banking

Other TV programs
《Game Legal》
《Game"15,16"》
《Recipes Why Not》
《Beautiful Cooking》
《Foodie 2 Shoes》
《Starry Kitchen》
《Club Sparkle》
《Dining With The Stars》
《Outsmart》
《Once A Fishing Village》
《Neighborhood Treasures》
《Kitchen Diva Louisa》
《Admiral's Feast Series》
《What The Face》
《Master So Food》
《Top Easts 100》
《Go Fun》
《Delicious》
《Maria & Friends》
《Vinci's code》

References

External links 
 Vanessa Yeung Official Website
 Vanessa Yeung Official Column
 Weibo
Profile of fashion model Vanessa Yeung 
Vanessa Yeung楊崢Fan Page 
《For Two in 32 minutes　把米芝蓮廚藝帶回家》

1972 births
Living people
Hong Kong film actresses
Hong Kong female models
Hong Kong television actresses
Actresses from Shanghai